Nong Yai is a district (amphoe) in the province Chonburi, Thailand.

History
The minor district (king amphoe) Nong Yai was created on 1 December 1975. The three tambons, Nong Yai, Khlong Phlu, and Nong Suea Chang were split off from Ban Bueng district. It was upgraded to a full district on 13 July 1981.

Geography
Neighboring districts are (from the south clockwise) Wang Chan and Pluak Daeng of Rayong province, Si Racha, Ban Bueng and Bo Thong of Chonburi Province.

Administration
The district is divided into five sub-districts (tambons), which are further subdivided into 24 villages (mubans). Nong Yai is a township (thesaban tambon) which covers the whole tambon Nong Yai. There are a further four tambon administrative organizations (TAO).

References

External links
amphoe.com

Nong Yai